"Narcotic Drugs and Psychotropic Substances Act" is the title of several national laws designed to implement the Single Convention on Narcotic Drugs and Convention on Psychotropic Substances, including:
Narcotic Drugs and Psychotropic Substances Act (Estonia)
Narcotic Drugs and Psychotropic Substances Act (India)
Narcotic Drugs and Psychotropic Substances Act (Sudan)

See also
Psychotropic Substances Act (disambiguation)